Pattamadai Narasimhan Shankar was an Indian scientist who worked in the field of fluid dynamics. He was married to Priti Shankar.

Education
He did his schooling in India and Switzerland, while obtaining his bachelor's degree in Mechanical Engineering in 1964 from Imperial College London. He completed his PhD degree in engineering science from California Institute of Technology under the supervision of Frank E. Marble in 1968.

Career and research
He worked at General Electric for two years before becoming an assistant professor at University of Maryland for the period 1970-72. In 1972, he moved to National Aerospace Laboratories and stayed there until his retirement in 2004.

Publications
Shankar is the author of several journal articles, mostly appeared in the Journal of Fluid Mechanics and Proceedings of the Royal Society. He is the author of the book:

Honors
He was the 1971 recipient of Robert T. Knapp Award given by ASME. He was elected as fellow in Indian Academy of Sciences in 1992.

References

External links
 

1944 births
2019 deaths
Fluid dynamicists
California Institute of Technology alumni